Anna Hämäläinen (born 24 March 1994, in Moscow) is a Finnish athlete who specialises in the 200 metres. She comes from a sporting family, both her mother, Olga, and father, Eduard Hämäläinen, were athletes who each won medals at the European Athletics Championships.

Hämäläinen represented Finland at the 2012 European Athletics Championships where she finished 27th overall in the heats of the 200 metres with a sprint of 24.14 seconds.

Achievements

References

External links 
 

1994 births
Living people
Athletes from Moscow
Finnish female sprinters
Finnish people of Russian descent